is a passenger railway station in located in the city of Ōmihachiman,  Shiga Prefecture, Japan, operated by the private railway operator Ohmi Railway.

Lines
Musa Station is served by the Ohmi Railway Yōkaichi Line, and is located 6.5 rail kilometers from the terminus of the line at Yōkaichi Station.

Station layout
The station consists of two unnumbered side platforms connected to the station building by a level crossing. The station is unattended.

Platforms

Adjacent stations

History
Musa Station was opened on December 29, 1913.

Passenger statistics
In fiscal 2017, the station was used by an average of 175 passengers daily (boarding passengers only).

Surroundings
 Ōmihachiman City Musa Community Center
 Ōmihachiman City Musa Elementary School
 Japan National Route 8
 Japan National Route 421
 Nakasendo Musa-juku

See also
List of railway stations in Japan

References

External links

 Ohmi Railway official site 

Railway stations in Japan opened in 1913
Railway stations in Shiga Prefecture
Ōmihachiman, Shiga